General Khalid Mahmud Arif  ( 29 December 1930 – 6 March 2020) popularly known as K.M. Arif, was a senior officer of the Pakistan Army, serving as the vice-chief of army staff under President Zia-ul-Haq, who retained the command of the army since 1976.

His career in the army was mostly spent in the military intelligence, and served in the East Pakistan Rifles, briefly fighting in the civil war aided by neighboring India. Upon repatriation to Pakistan in 1973, he continued with his military service in the army and eventually ascended as director-general of military intelligence before assuming the staff appointment at the Army GHQ. Appointed as vice-chief of army staff in 1984, he played crucial role in stabilizing the administration of President Zia-ul-Haq, and was succeeded by General Mirza Aslam Beg as army chief in March 1987.

Upon his retirement in 1987, he authored several books on the political and military history of Pakistan, of which Working With Zia: Pakistan's Power Politics is the best known.

Biography
Khalid Mahmud Arif was born on 29 December 1930 in a Kakazai family in East Punjab, India and immigrated to Pakistan following the partition. He attended Edwardes College in Peshawar and graduated in 1947.

After passing the ISSB's examinations, he joined the Pakistan Military Academy in Kakul as a cadet and graduated in 1947, where he was selected to do advance training on Infantry tactics in Kohat, North-West Frontier Province. His family permanently moved in Kohat as he gained commissioned into the Armoured Corps. In 1952, he was selected for further military training in the United States and was sent to attend the United States Army Armor School at Fort Knox, where he graduated in specializing in the armoured tactics. He was further educated in Military College of Signals in Rawalpindi where he excelled in intelligence management, and graduated in the staff course degree from the Command and Staff College in Quetta, Balochistan, Pakistan.

War appointments and in East Pakistan
In 1965,  Arif, as a captain, served in the armoured corps along with then-Major Zia-ul-Haq and participated in the second war with India over the disputed Kashmir. Arif commanded an American M48 tank against the Indian Army.

After the war, he was sent back to the military intelligence and stationed in East Pakistan (in the East Pakistan Rifles).

In 1967, he greatly aided towards troop redeployment of the Eastern Command in formulating a battle plan, codename: "Operation X-Sunderbans-1." The deployment, however, was non combative and it was only designed to form the basis for the operational combat plan. In 1969, he was posted in Dhaka as a martial law officer under the Government of East Pakistan led by Governor Vice-Admiral Syed Mohammad Ahsan in 1969. During this stint, Arif reportedly relied a secretive message in his complied report in regards to the situation in East that ultimately warned off the consequences of the civil war. In March 1971, he witnessed the meeting with President Yahya Khan who decided the launch of the military operations  against the rebels in the East should take place. Arif took over the situation himself to control the law and order.

About this meeting, Arif described the meeting as: President Yahya took matters in his hands, thus good bye to civil bureaucracy. In East, he fought and led companies to fight the approaching Indian Army, and was captured by the Indian Army units who held him as war prisoner after the instrument of surrender was signed between Lieutenant-General A.A.K. Niazi and Lieutenant General Jagjit Singh Aurora, GOC-in-C of Eastern Command of Indian military in 1971.

Command and staff appointments
His efforts and actions in the liberation war in East that accounted his bravery had earned admiration in Pakistan which led to Prime Minister Zulfikar Ali Bhutto accepting recommendations to decorate Major Arif with service award, Sitara-e-Basalat. In 1975, he was repatriated to Pakistan from the Wagha and was allowed to resume his military service, being promoted as Lieutenant-Colonel. He testified in the War Enquiry Commission led by Chief Justice Hamoodur Rahman, giving accounts of military intelligence failures took place in East.

In 1976, he was promoted as Colonel and Brigadier in 1977, of which, he assumed the command of the 111th Brigade stationed in Islamabad; this command appointment lasted only eight months.

The general elections held in 1977 saw the victory of Pakistan Peoples Party led by Zulfikar Ali Bhutto, caused the public agitation led by the conservative alliance whose politicians refused to accept the results amid alleged vote rigging. Brig. K. M. Arif ultimately leaked and informed Prime Minister Bhutto of covert coup d'état took place under his appointed-army chief General Zia-ul-Haq, but the latter refused to believe him. Acting upon warnings by Brig. Arif, Bhutto did accept all demands by the conservative alliance but the coup d'état had already took place.

After receiving orders from Lieutenant-General F.A. Chishti, GoC-in-C of X Corps, Brigadier Arif rotated the 111th Brigade to take control of the civilian government in support of Chief of Army Staff General Zia-ul-Haq and Chairman joint chiefs Mohammad Shariff. After the coup d'état was completed, General Zia's promoted Brigadier Arif as Major-General and appointed him as Director-General of Military Intelligence (DGMI).

In a views of Lieutenant-General Chishti who noted: "General Zia was lucky to have Major-General Arif as his life long confidante. He had experience as a Martial Law Officer during General's Yahya's regime and handled matters efficiently."

In 1979, he helped and aided in preparing a national security strategy against the Russian invasion of Afghanistan, after a meeting with President Zia-ul-Haq upon the latter's request.

Vice Chief of Army Staff (1984–87)

A quintessential staff officer, Major-General Arif's career accelerated and gained reputation as an effective commander in the military intelligence. Major-General Arif served in the military intelligence until 1983 when he promoted as Lieutenant-General and posted in a staff assignment in the Army GHQ.  At the Army GHQ, he brought most qualified officers who had worked with him in the past assignments, and built up his reputation in army as an effective leader. On 11 March 1983, Lieutenant-General Arif, along with Chairman Senate Ghulam Ishaq Khan, was invited by Munir Ahmad Khan, then-Chairman of PAEC, to witnessed the subcritical testing of an atomic device that took place in a hidden weapons-testing sites.

Despite never effectively commanding the field assignments, he was named and appointed as Vice Chief of Army Staff under President Zia in 1984. Upon being promoted to four-star rank army general, he assumed the command of Pakistan Army as its Vice-Chief of Army Staff under President Zia.

To many observers, this promotion, in fact, made General Arif the chief of army staff of the Pakistan Army with the entire commanding staff reporting to him.

As an army chief, General Arif played a crucial role towards the successful implementation of the secretive atomic bomb programme after removing the civilian administrator, Mubashir Hassan. Towards diplomacy with the United States, General Arif made frequent trips with United States, successfully convincing the Reagan administration to allow the secretive atomic bomb development by making it very clear to the United States that "[Pakistan] won't compromise on its nuclear weapons programme, but won't conduct a test to harm to relationship between two nations." In 1983, the Central Intelligence Agency (CIA) placed a mole near the Kahuta Research Laboratories but was thwarted by the ISI, which according to General Arif, the ISI took the mole to its secret museum to train its own spies in espionage operations. He was described as a very uptight and strict army officer by civilian scientists, specifically dr. Abdul Qadeer Khan in his memoirs, did not compromise on his morals and disciplines throughout his career.

In 1984, General Arif's tenure also saw the commissioning of the Bell AH-1 Cobra Attack helicopters in the aviation corps.

In 1986–87, he deployed and rotated the V Corps, with support from the Southern Air Command to deter the Indian Army's major military exercise that took place near Pakistan's border under supervision of General Sundarji, then-army chief of Indian Army. During this time, he refuted the claims made by dr. A.Q. Khan and immediately issued directives towards the policy of deliberate ambiguity over the clandestine atomic bomb programme.

Post retirement

In 1987, General Arif sought retirement from his military service and did not seek extension and handed over the army command to Lieutenant-General Mirza Aslam Beg who was promoted to the four-star rank and as an army chief.

Upon retiring, he focused towards poetry and became a military historian when he authored the notable eyewitnessed and famed text on the military interference led General Zia-ul-Haq, Working with Zia, published in 1995. In 2001, he published Khaki Shadows: Pakistan 1947–1997, about the politics, government, and armed forces of  Pakistan during and shortly after the Cold War.

In 2010, he authored another book, Estranged Neighbours: India, Pakistan (1947-2010) on the foreign relations of India and Pakistan. Gen (Retd) K M Arif died on 6 March 2020 in ICU CMH Lahore due to Kidney disease.

Awards and decorations

Foreign decorations

Works

References

1931 births
2020 deaths
Punjabi people
People from Jalandhar district
Edwardes College alumni
People from Kohat District
Pakistan Military Academy alumni
Pakistan Armoured Corps officers
Military intelligence
People of East Pakistan
People of the Bangladesh Liberation War
Pakistani military personnel of the Indo-Pakistani War of 1971
Pakistani military writers
Pakistani prisoners of war
Pakistani generals
Military government of Pakistan (1977–1988)
Project-706 people
Pakistani memoirists
Pakistani military historians
Pakistani poets
Recipients of Nishan-e-Imtiaz
Recipients of the Legion of Merit